George Edmond Manley (born September 17, 1965) is an American voice actor, novelist and screenwriter. He attended San Jose State University, majoring in theatre arts, University of Nevada, Reno, majoring in journalism and holds his associate of science degree in Computer Information Systems and trained at San Francisco's Voice One Studio and with Braintracks Audio's Nancy Wolfson in commercial and character voiceover. He performed voice work at ADV Films, including Francesco in the second volume of Noir; Impact, the giant robot in Legend of the Mystical Ninja; Hyugi Zeravire from Gravion Zwei; Barba from Hakugei: Legend of The Moby Dick; and the English-language narrator for Science Ninja Team Gatchaman. He wrote a script adaptation for six episodes of Gantz, and is the series writer for the adaptation of Super Dimension Fortress Macross, 009-1, Coyote Ragtime Show, Pumpkin Scissors and Full Metal Panic! The Second Raid. Manley became a voice artist, after meeting and receiving encouragement at the 2002 FanimeCon from Amanda Winn-Lee, Tiffany Grant and Matt Greenfield. Manley is an on-air personality for Houston's Taping for the Blind Radio (now known as Turning Sight into Sound Radio), reading the Houston Chronicle and Sports Illustrated on a weekly basis.

Filmography

Anime
 009-1 – Double Gomez, Apollo
 Area 88 – Charlie (OAV), Gustav Tanhelm (TV series)
 Akame ga Kill! – Ogre
 Aura Battler Dunbine – Captain Kawasse, Lord Shotan, Puradon, Kotaro
 Blue Drop – Hasegawa (Mari's Driver)
 Bodacious Space Pirates – Schnitzer
 The Book of Bantorra – Ruweek Hartain, Boramotte, Karune
 Canaan – U.S. President
 Children Who Chase Lost Voices – Commander of Arned Priest
 Chrono Crusade – Viede, Gotti
 Coicent – Blue Brother
 Comic Party Revolution – The Chief, Nagase Chou
 Coyote Ragtime Show – Admiral Malcolm Floyd
 Cromartie High School – Masked Takenouchi
 Devil Survivor 2: The Animation – Byakko
 Dirty Pair: Affair of Nolandia – Yullgis
 Divergence Eve – Doctor Kessler
 Five Numbers! – VO (Old Man/Enplein)
 Fullmetal Alchemist: Brotherhood – Darius
 Full Metal Panic! The Second Raid – Gate's Subordinate
 Gantz – Haruya
 Ghost Stories – Asai, Muffled Doctor
 Gintama: The Movie – Henpeita Takeuchi
 Godannar – Moukaku
 Gravion Zwei – Hyugi Zeravire
 Hakugei: Legend of The Moby Dick – Barba
 Hakkenden: Eight Dogs of the East – Toad Spirit
 Hakuōki – Kai Shimada
 Halo Legends – Berger (The Babysitter)
 Horizon in the Middle of Nowhere – Tadatsugu Sakai
 Intrigue in the Bakumatsu - Irohanihoheto – Genba Hario
 Kaleido Star – Marine Park Owner, Herron
 Kurau Phantom Memory – Frank Zaksman
 Legends of the Dark King – Jadaum
 Legend of the Mystical Ninja – Impact
 Log Horizon – Isaac
 Maburaho – Principal Mori
 Madlax – Lieutenant "Pops" Nyman
 Majestic Prince – Dolgana
 Majikoi! – Oh! Samurai Girls – Cookie (Form II & V)
 Maria Holic – Narrator
 Megazone 23 – Guts, Computer Tech, Alphonse
 Michel – Sitel
 Neon Genesis Evangelion – Man in Suit
 Nerima Daikon Brothers – Buff Pandaikon
 Night Raid 1931 – Director, Kanji Ishihara
 Noir – Francesco, Boss Bertonie
 One Piece (Funimation dub) – Hatchan, Montblanc Cricket
 Papuwa – Isami Kondo
 Parasyte - Hirama
 Problem Children Are Coming from Another World, Aren't They? - Deen, Water God
 Project Blue Earth SOS – Commander Horner
 Pumpkin Scissors – Lance Corporal Mercury, Old Man (episode 6)
 RahXephon – Ulysses Captain, Captain Nomad
 Saint Seiya – Dante (ADV Dub)
 Samurai Gun – Lord Kozan
 Science Ninja Team Gatchaman (ADV dub) – Narrator
 Shining Hearts: Shiawase no Pan – Hank
 Short Peace – Gimlet (A Farewell to Weapons)
 Tears to Tiara – Ladu, Bublux
 The Super Dimension Fortress Macross – Lynn Shaochin
 Those Who Hunt Elves – Villager, Mary the Shepherd, Santa Claus, Sorcerer, Tree Demon
 Xam'd: Lost Memories – Senten Island Commandant
 Yugo the Negotiator – Senior Lieutenant Viktor

Live-Action
 Meet My Folks – Mailman (episodes 1 and 3)
 Room – Jim
 The Brain Storm – BLT

Video games
 Kohan II: Kings of War – Jonas Teramun/Sijansur, Xander Kharei, King Agborus, Ord
 Axis & Allies RTS – General George Patton, Field Marshal Konstantin Rokossovski, Field Marshal Bernard Law Montgomery, Vice Admiral Gunichi Mikawa, American Commander, Tutorial Narrator

Production staff

ADR Script Adaptation
 009-1
 The Ambition of Nobuna Oda
 Amnesia
 Black Bullet
 Bryhildr: in The Darkness
 Coyote Ragtime Show
 Devil Survivor 2: The Animation 
 Dog & Scissors
 Dramatical Murder
 Full Metal Panic! The Second Raid
 Gantz 
 Gatchaman Crowds -insight-
 Hakkenden: Eight Dogs of the East (season 1 and 2)
 Hakuoki: The Boisterous Dance of Kyoto
 Hakuoki: The Blue Sky of a Samurai's Spirit
 Hamatora - Season 2
 Hanayamata
 Log Horizon
 Log Horizon 2
 Magical Warfare
 Majestic Prince
 MM!
 Pumpkin Scissors 
 Rozen Maiden: Zurückspulen
 Samurai Bride
 Say "I Love You".
 The Super Dimension Fortress Macross 
 The World God Only Knows: Goddess Arc
 When Supernatural Battles Became Commonplace
 Upotte!!

Spotting
 Girls und Panzer der Film
 My Love Story
 Utawarerumono: The False Faces

References

External links
 
 

1965 births
21st-century American male actors
21st-century American male writers
American television writers
American male screenwriters
American male television writers
American male voice actors
Living people
Male actors from Sacramento, California
San Jose State University alumni
University of Nevada, Reno alumni
Writers from Sacramento, California
Male actors from Houston
Writers from Houston
Screenwriters from California
Screenwriters from Texas
21st-century American screenwriters